Hiroyuki Yamamoto may refer to:

Hiroyuki Yamamoto (wheelchair racer) (born 1966), Japanese wheelchair athlete
Hiroyuki Yamamoto (runner), Japanese competitor in events such as the 2016 New York City Marathon
Hiroyuki Yamamoto (footballer) (born 1979), Japanese footballer
Hiroyuki Yamamoto (composer) (born 1967), Japanese composer